Guns N' Roses are an American hard rock band formed 1985 in Los Angeles, California. They are led by frontman and co-founder Axl Rose, and also include Slash (lead guitar), Dizzy Reed (keyboards), Duff McKagan (bass), Melissa Reese (keyboards), Richard Fortus (guitar), & Frank Ferrer (drums). Guns N' Roses have released five studio albums, all on the Geffen Records label: Appetite for Destruction (1987), Use Your Illusion I (1991), Use Your Illusion II (1991), "The Spaghetti Incident?" (1993), and Chinese Democracy (2008). Guns N' Roses have sold more than 45 million albums in the United States.

The band have won four American Music Awards, including Favorite Pop/Rock Single for "Sweet Child o' Mine" in 1989, both Favorite Heavy Metal/Hard Rock Artist and Favorite Heavy Metal/Hard Rock Album for Appetite For Destruction in 1990, and Favorite Heavy Metal/Hard Rock Artist for the second time in 1992. Guns N' Roses have received four Grammy Awards nominations, but has yet to win. The band was nominated for Best Hard Rock Performance three times, in 1990, 1992, and 1993. Overall, Guns N' Roses has received 14 awards from 38 nominations.

American Music Awards
The American Music Awards is an annual awards ceremony created by Dick Clark in 1973. Guns N' Roses have received four awards from eight nominations.

|-
|rowspan="3"|  || "Sweet Child o' Mine" || Favorite Pop/Rock Single || 
|-
| Guns N' Roses || Favorite Heavy Metal/Hard Rock Artist || 
|-
| Appetite for Destruction || Favorite Heavy Metal/Hard Rock Album  || 
|-
|rowspan="2"|  || Guns N' Roses || Favorite Heavy Metal/Hard Rock Artist || 
|-
| Appetite for Destruction || Favorite Heavy Metal/Hard Rock Album || 
|-
|rowspan="3"|  ||rowspan="2"| Guns N' Roses || Favorite Heavy Metal/Hard Rock Artist || 
|-
| Favorite Pop/Rock Band/Duo/Group || 
|-
| Use Your Illusion I || Favorite Heavy Metal/Hard Rock Album ||

BRIT Awards
The BRIT Awards are the British Phonographic Industry's annual pop music awards. Guns N' Roses have received four nominations.

|-
|rowspan="3"| 1990 ||rowspan="2"| Guns N' Roses || Best International Newcomer || 
|-
| Best International Group || 
|-
| "Paradise City" || Best Music Video || 
|-
| 1992 || Guns N' Roses || Best International Group ||

Billboard Music Awards
The Billboard Music Award is an honor given by Billboard, a publication and music popularity chart covering the music business. The Billboard Music Awards show had been held annually since 1990 in December

|-
| 1988 || Guns N' Roses || Top Pop New Artist || 
|-
|rowspan="3"| 2017 ||rowspan="2"| Guns N' Roses || Top Duo/Group || 
|-
|| Top Touring Artist || 
|-
| Not in This Lifetime... Tour || Top Rock Tour || 
|-
|rowspan="3"| 2018 ||rowspan="2"| Guns N' Roses || Top Touring Artist||  
|-
|| Top Rock Tour ||

Billboard Touring Awards
The Billboard Touring Conference and Awards is an annual meeting sponsored by Billboard magazine which also honors the top international live entertainment industry artists and professionals. Established in 2004, it has thus been described as "part industry conference, part awards show".

|-
|rowspan="3"| 2017 ||rowspan="2"| Not in This Lifetime... Tour ||| Top Boxscore || 
|-
|  Top Tour/Top Draw || 
|-

Echo Awards
The ECHO awards are an accolade by the Deutsche Phono-Akademie, an association of recording companies of Germany to recognize outstanding achievement in the music industry. The Awards have been held since 1992.

|-
|rowspan="1"| 1993 ||rowspan="1"| Guns N' Roses||International Group of the Year ||

GAFFA Awards

Denmark GAFFA Awards
Delivered since 1991, the GAFFA Awards are a Danish award that rewards popular music by the magazine of the same name. Guns N' Roses has received six nominations.

!
|-
| rowspan="4"| 1991
| Guns N' Roses
| Concert of the Year
| 
| style="text-align:center;" rowspan="6"|
|-
| Use Your Illusion
| Album of the Year
| 
|-
| rowspan="2"| "Don't Cry"
| Song of the Year
| 
|-
| Music Video of the Year
| 
|-
| rowspan="2"| 1993
| rowspan="2"| Guns N' Roses
| Most Overrated
| 
|-
| Concert of the Year
| 
|-
|}

Grammy Awards
The Grammy Awards are awarded annually by the National Academy of Recording Arts and Sciences of the United States. Guns N' Roses have received four nominations.

|-
|  || G N' R Lies || Best Hard Rock Performance || 
|-
|  || Use Your Illusion I || Best Hard Rock Performance || 
|-
|  || "Live and Let Die" || Best Hard Rock Performance || 
|-
|  || Appetite for Destruction Locked N' Loaded edition || Best Boxed or Special Limited Edition Package||

Juno Awards
The JUNO Awards are presented annually to Canadian musical artists and bands to acknowledge their artistic and technical achievements in all aspects of music. Non-Canadian artists are eligible for several awards, including the International Album of the Year.

|-
|rowspan="1"| 2009 ||rowspan="1"| Chinese Democracy||Juno Award for International Album of the Year ||

MTV Video Music Awards
The MTV Video Music Awards is an annual awards ceremony established in 1984 by MTV. Guns N' Roses have received four awards from nine nominations.

|-
|  || "Welcome to the Jungle" || Best New Artist in a Video || 
|-
|rowspan="3"|  ||rowspan="2"| "Sweet Child O' Mine" || Best Heavy Metal Video || 
|-
| Best Group Video || 
|-
| "Paradise City" || Best Stage Performance in a Video || 
|-
|rowspan="2"|  ||rowspan="2"| "You Could Be Mine" || Best Heavy Metal/Hard Rock Video || 
|-
| Best Video from a Film || 
|-
|rowspan="3"|  || Guns N' Roses || Video Vanguard Award || 
|-
|rowspan="2"| "November Rain" || Best Cinematography in a Video || 
|-
| Best Art Direction in a Video ||

ZD Awards 
 Zvukovaya Dorozhka  ("sound track") is  Russia's oldest hit parade in field of popular music. Since 2003 it is presented in a ceremony in concert halls. It’s considered one of the major Russian music awards.

!
|-
| 2018
| Not in This Lifetime... Tour (live at Otkrytie Arena)
| Tour of the Year
| 
| style="text-align:center;" |
|-
|}

World Music Awards
The World Music Awards honors recording artists based on worldwide sales figures provided by the International Federation of the Phonographic Industry. Guns N' Roses have received two awards.

|-
|rowspan="2"| 1993 ||rowspan="2"| Guns N' Roses || World's Best-Selling Hard Rock Artist of the Year || 
|-
| World’s Best Group ||

Other Awards

|-
|rowspan="1"| 2008 ||rowspan="1"| If The World from Body of Lies||13th Satellite Awards: Best Original Song || 
|-
|rowspan="1"| 2014 ||rowspan="1"| Axl Rose||Revolver Golden Gods Ronnie James Dio Lifetime Achievement award || 
|-
|rowspan="1"| 2015 ||rowspan="1"| Appetite for Democracy 3D||International 3D & Advanced Imaging Society Awards: Best 3D Music Entertainment feature || 
|-
|rowspan="1"| 2019 ||rowspan="1"| Not In This Lifetime... Tour||Ticketmaster Touring Milestone Award||

References

Awards
Lists of awards received by American musician
Lists of awards received by musical group